Ryan Francis Patrick Galvin (born 31 January 2001) is an English professional footballer who plays as a defender for Maidstone United on loan from Sheffield Wednesday.

Career

Early career
Galvin started his career at Wigan Athletic in July 2018, and joined Stafford Rangers on loan in November 2019.

Sheffield Wednesday
He joined Sheffield Wednesday on a free transfer in January 2020 following a trial period at the club. He was named in the Sheffield Wednesday starting line-up for his debut on 9 January 2021 in an FA Cup third round match away to Exeter City. A one year option was activated in his contract on 12 May 2021, keeping him at the club until the summer of 2022. On 13 August 2021, he joined Gloucester City on a one-mouth loan deal, with the possibility to extend. On 13 September, Galvin would sign a new deal at Sheffield Wednesday until the summer of 2023, and remain on loan with Gloucester City until January 2022.

On 13 September 2022, Galvin joined Maidstone United on an initial two month loan spell. He would win the player-of-the-month award for October during his loan spell. His loan spell was extended further on the 11 November and 16 December by additional months. It was confirmed on 13 January 2023 that his loan would be until the end of the season.

Career statistics

References

External links
 

2001 births
Living people
English footballers
Association football defenders
Wigan Athletic F.C. players
Stafford Rangers F.C. players
Sheffield Wednesday F.C. players
Gloucester City A.F.C. players
Maidstone United F.C. players
English Football League players